This is a list of Canadians who have raced in American Championship Car Racing.

Ross Bentley
Bert Brooks
Claude Bourbonnais
Billy Bourque
Buddie Boys
Jack Buxton
John Cannon
Patrick Carpentier
Ed Crombie
Howard Dauphin
John Duff
George Eaton
Norm Ellefson
George Fejer
Billy Foster
Scott Goodyear
Allen Heath
Ludwig Heimrath
Ludwig Heimrath Jr.
Pete Henderson
Cliff Hucul
John Jones
Ed Kostenuk
Harry MacDonald
Bon MacDougall
Joe Mazzucco
Arthur Miller
Greg Moore
Andrew Ranger
Eldon Rasmussen
Hal Robson
Ray Shadbolt
Alex Tagliani
Paul Tracy
Ira Vail
Michael Valiante
Jacques Villeneuve
Jacques Villeneuve Sr.
Frank Weiss

External links
ChampCarStats

Champ Car
Champ Car